Vincent Courtois (born 21 March 1968) is a French jazz cellist.

Biography 
Courtois studied classical cello at the Conservatory of Aubervilliers, first with Erwan Fauré, and then with Roland Pidoux and Frédéric Lodéon. He also played Didier Levallet and Dominique Pifarély, and since 1988 in bandslead by Christian Escoudé and Didier Levallet ("Swing String System") in Paris. In addition he started his own quartet in 1990, releasing his debut solo album Cello News the same year.

He played in the duo with Martial Solal from 1993, with Julien Lourau in "Pendulum Quartet", with Franck Tortiller in the band "Tukish Blend" and the trio "Zebra 3", and in addition he played with Xavier Desandre Navarre. He has also contributed to the album Marvellous (1994) with Michel Petrucciani, Tony Williams and Dave Holland.

In 1995 Courtois performed his first solo concerts, he played within François Corneloup's Septett, and collaborated with Louis Sclavis making music for film and theatre. He also recorded two albums with the quintet of Rabih Abou-Khalil, and in 1998 he participated in an ensemble led by Pierre Favre, and a trio with Yves Robert. In 2000 he performed in three trio constellations, in 2002 a quintet played at the festival "Banlieues Bleues", and in a trio with Ellery Eskelin and Sylvie Courvoisier.

In 2005 Courtois joined Michele Rabbia and Marilyn Crispell to play in Bamako with his own trio. He was involved with Henri Texiers in recording the music to the movie Holy Lola by Bertrand Tavernier. In 2006 he initiated a new quartet with Jeanne Lagt, Marc Baron and François Merville. In 2008 he released the album L' homme avion with Ze Jam Afane.

Discography

As leader 
 1990: Cello News (Nocturne), with Vincent Courtois Quartet (Pierre Christophe, Benoit Dunoyer de Segonzac, Serge Gacon)
 1991: Pleine Lune (Nocturne), with Pierre Christophe, Xavier Desandre, Benoît Dunoyer de Segonzac, Serge Gacon, and Julien Loureau
 1994: Turkish Blend (Al Sur), with Gilles Andrieux
 1995: Pendulum Quartet (Bond Age), with Julien Lourau, Benoit Dunoyer de Segonzac, and Daniel Garcia Bruno
 2000: Translucide (Enja), with Noël Akchoté, Michel Godard, and Yves Robert
 2001: The Fitting Room (Enja), with Marc Ducret and Dominique Pifarély
 2003: Les Contes de Rose Manivelle (Le Triton)
 2005: Trio Rouge with Lucilla Galeazzi and Michel Godard
 2006: What Do You Mean By Silence? (Le Triton), with Vincent Courtois Quartet
 2008: L'homme Avion (Chief Inspector), with Ze Jam Afane
 2008: As Soon As Possible (C.A.M. Jazz), with Sylvie Courvoisier and Ellery Eskelin
 2010: L'Imprévu (La Buissonne)
 2011: Live In Berlin (Le Triton), with Vincent Courtois Quartet
 2012: Mediums (La Buissonne)
 2014: West (La Buissonne)
 2017: Bandes Originales (La Buissonne), with Daniel Erdmann, Robin Fincker

Collaborations 
With Stefano Battaglia/Michele Rabbia/Dominique Pifarély/Michel Godard
 2002: Atem (Splasc(H))

With John Greaves, Sophia Domancich
 2003: The Trouble with Happiness (Le Chant du Monde)

With Michael Riessler & Singer Pur
 2004: Ahi Vita (ACT)

With Michele Rabbia and Marilyn Crispell
 2006: Shifting Grace (CAM Jazz)

With Daniel Erdmann, Samuel Rohrer and Frank Möbus
 2011: How to Catch a Cloud (Intakt)
 2013: From the Inside of a Cloud (Arjunamusic)
 2015: Ten Songs About Real Utopia (Arjunamusic)

With Joëlle Léandre
 2014: Live at Kesselhaus Berlin 08.06.2013 (Jazzdor Series)

With Louis Sclavis and Dominique Pifarely
 2017: Asian Field Variations (ECM)

With Adam Bałdych
 2020: Clouds (ACT), with Adam Bałdych, violin and Rogier Telderman, piano

As sideman
With Rabih Abou-Khalil
Yara (Enja, 1998)
The Cactus of Knowledge (Enja, 2001)

References

External links 
 
 

Living people
Musicians from Paris
French jazz musicians
1968 births
French cellists